Solar power in Wisconsin In 2026, Wisconsin rooftops can accommodate approximately 37 GWs of solar capacity and produce 44,183 GWh of electricity, nearly 70% of the statewide generation in 2019. Net metering is available for systems up to at least 20 kW, and excess generation is credited at retail rate to customers next bill. Some utilities allow net metering up to 100 kW. For Xcel customers, kilowatt credits are rolled over monthly and are reconciled annually at avoided cost. Best practices recommend no limits, either individually or aggregate, and perpetual roll over of kilowatt credits.

A 2016 estimate indicates that a typical 5 kW solar array installed in Wisconsin will pay for itself in 13 years and go on to provide an additional profit of $18,860 during its 25-year life. Wisconsin's renewable portfolio standard requires 10% renewable sources for electricity by 2015.

Implications
In 2007, Wisconsin's largest solar array was the 44.4 kW array on the Urban Ecology Center in Milwaukee.

In 2011, the largest array was the 360 kW parking lot array in Verona owned by Epic, which is being expanded to 2.2 MW. A 3.177 MW array is planned for a distribution center in Oconomowoc.

In June 2016, the 2.3 MW Rock River solar project near Beloit became the largest solar farm in Wisconsin.

The KI convention center located in Green Bay, WI currently (as of 2013) has the largest solar PV installation in Northeastern Wisconsin. The new 115-kilowatt array comprises 480 PV solar panels.

As of May 2014 there are about 2,250 homes powered by solar energy in Wisconsin.

Wisconsin ranks 24th in the nation for the number of solar jobs. Between 2012 and 2014, Wisconsin has added 800 jobs in the solar industry.

Water Treatment Facilities
In Superior, WI the cities wastewater treatment plant has installed four So-larBee units to provide adequate aeration without the use of the cities 75-hp units. After this installation the 75-hp blower units could be completely shut off during no-flow periods and in result the city of Superior saved $18,000 per month.

Statistics 

Source: NREL

See also
Wind power in Wisconsin
Solar power in the United States
Renewable energy in the United States

References

External links

 Renewable energy policies and incentives

Energy in Wisconsin
Wisconsin